The Champlain Clay is a geologic formation in Maine. It preserves fossils.

See also

 List of fossiliferous stratigraphic units in Maine
 Paleontology in Maine

References
 

Geologic formations of Maine